Mehdi Ghayedi (born 5 December 1998) is an Iranian professional footballer who plays as a forward or second striker for Persian Gulf League club Esteghlal and the Iran national team.

Club career

Iranjavan
Ghayedi was born in Bushehr, Iran, and started his career at youth level with Iranjavan Bushehr. He was promoted to the senior squad before the start of the 2016–17 and scored 10 times. He was named as the Azadegan League young player of the season for the 2016–17 season in July 2017.

Esteghlal

On 8 June 2017, Ghayedi signed a three-year contract with Esteghlal, upon signing for Esteghlal, he was given the number 16.

At the start of the season the FFIRI banned him from playing along with two fellow Esteghlal teammates Majid Hosseini and Omid Noorafkan as Alireza Mansourian prevented them to join Iran under-23 camp. The deprivation from the FFIRI was finally cancelled on 29 July 2017 after missing the first week of the season and the players eligible to play for the second week of the 2017–18 campaign. He finally made his debut for Esteghlal on 4 August 2017, in a 0–0 draw against Esteghlal Khuzestan entering the match as a substitute for Omid Noorafkan. At the end of the match, even though he played for a few minutes, he was praised for his skills and effort. After making his debut he became the youngest player to play for the club in the league, a record which was held by Omid Noorafkan previously.

Ghayedi started his first match for the club in a 3–0 victory over Sepahan on 6 December. On 25 January 2018, Esteghlal was awarded a penalty after a foul on Ghayedi which was converted by Server Djeparov in the 4–0 victory against Pars Jonoubi Jam; he also assisted Ali Ghorbani's goal in the same match. He was named the man of the match for his performance.

On 29 January, Ghayedi was involved in a serious car crash in his hometown Bushehr along with his friends and his cousin who died a few days later. As result of the accident, he went through a surgery due to his Spleen being damaged by trauma and was ruled out for the rest of the season. A day later Esteghlal beat Sanat Naft in Hazfi Cup and his teammates dedicated the victory to him. In August 2021, Ghayedi was linked with a move to Qatari side Al-Gharafa.

Shabab Al Ahli
On 23 August 2021, Ghayedi transferred to Shabab Al Ahli Dubai on a five-year contract.

International career

Youth
Ghayedi was selected to join Iran under-20 to take part in the 2017 FIFA U-20 World Cup, under manager Amir Hossein Peiravani. After sitting on the bench for Iran's opening match against Costa Rica, he made his tournament debut against Zambia and played for 18 minutes in Iran's 4–2 defeat. He also played for a few minutes against Portugal as Iran lost the match and was knocked out of the competition.

Senior
On 4 October 2020, Dragan Skočić called Ghayedi up for friendly against Uzbekistan. On 8 October 2020, he made his senior international debut against Uzbekistan.

Style of play
Ghayedi often uses nutmeg skill for dribbling in one-on-one situations.

Career statistics

Club

International

Scores and results list Iran's goal tally first, score column indicates score after each Ghayedi goal.

Honours

Esteghlal
Hazfi Cup: 2017–18
 Iranian Super Cup: 2022

Individual
Persian Gulf Pro League most assists: 2019–20
AFC Best Young Player of the Year: 2020

References

External links

1998 births
Living people
People from Bushehr
Iranian footballers
Iranian expatriate footballers
Association football forwards
Association football wingers
Iranjavan players
Shahin Bushehr F.C. players
Esteghlal F.C. players
Shabab Al-Ahli Club players
Azadegan League players
Persian Gulf Pro League players
UAE Pro League players
Iran under-20 international footballers
Asian Games competitors for Iran
Footballers at the 2018 Asian Games
Iran international footballers
Expatriate footballers in the United Arab Emirates
Iranian expatriate sportspeople in the United Arab Emirates
21st-century Iranian people